Steven James "Steve" Centanni is an American former news reporter for Fox News Channel.

Journalism career
Centanni joined FNC in 1996.

Previous to Fox, Centanni had worked for KRON-TV in San Francisco, California.

Centanni retired in August 2014.

Education
Centanni attended the University of Colorado at Boulder and earned a Bachelor's degree in broadcasting from San Francisco State University.

Gaza kidnapping

On August 14, 2006, he was kidnapped by Palestinian gunmen while on assignment in Gaza City, along with Olaf Wiig, a cameraman from New Zealand. A witness saw two vehicles blocking the journalist's transmission truck and a masked man put a gun to their bodyguard's head, forcing him to the ground.

An internal message by Fox News Channel Senior Vice President John Moody confirmed the abduction and instructed employees not to comment on it.

On August 19, Fox News Channel broadcast a video by Centanni's brother pleading for the reporter's immediate release.

On August 23, the Holy Jihad Brigades claimed responsibility for the kidnappings of both Centanni and Wiig. They demanded the release of all "Muslim prisoners" by the United States within 72 hours. A video was broadcast by Al-Jazeera. No armed men were in the video, and the captives appeared to be in good health.

On August 26, the three-day deadline passed uneventfully at 9:00 GMT. Hours earlier, Ismail Haniyeh, a senior Hamas official, said there were promises that the journalists "will not be harmed" and that he expected the situation to resolve in the "coming hours".

Release 
On August 27, the Palestinian news service Ramattan and FOX News reported that Centanni and Wiig were released unharmed, shortly after a new video was released. In the video, both journalists, wearing beige robes, read statements saying that they had converted to Islam, with Centanni stating "Islam is not just meant for some people; it is the true religion for all people at all times."  After being freed, Centanni stated "We were forced to convert to Islam at gunpoint, and don't get me wrong here, I have the highest respect for Islam, and learned a lot of very good things about it, but it was something we felt we had to do, because they had the guns, and we didn't know what the hell was going on."

See also
List of kidnappings

References

External links 

 Bio on FoxNews.com

1946 births
2000s missing person cases
American television reporters and correspondents
Formerly missing people
Fox News people
Journalists from California
Kidnapped American people
Kidnappings by Islamists
Living people
San Francisco State University alumni
University of Colorado Boulder alumni